Toxeutotaenius elfriedae is a South American Betsy beetle of the family Passalidae.

References

External links

Passalidae
Beetles of South America
Beetles described in 1931